Brent Newdick (born 31 January 1985 in Tauranga) is a New Zealand representative decathlete.

He won the silver medal in the men's decathlon at the 2010 Commonwealth Games, and placed 12th in the 2012 Summer Olympics.

He was also the reigning champion of the Taihape Gumboot Throwing Competition until 2017.

Achievements

Personal bests

References

Commonwealth Games silver medallists for New Zealand
Athletes (track and field) at the 2006 Commonwealth Games
Athletes (track and field) at the 2010 Commonwealth Games
Athletes (track and field) at the 2014 Commonwealth Games
1985 births
Living people
New Zealand decathletes
Athletes (track and field) at the 2012 Summer Olympics
Olympic athletes of New Zealand
Sportspeople from Tauranga
Commonwealth Games medallists in athletics
Universiade medalists in athletics (track and field)
Universiade silver medalists for New Zealand
Universiade bronze medalists for New Zealand
Medalists at the 2009 Summer Universiade
Medalists at the 2013 Summer Universiade
Medallists at the 2010 Commonwealth Games